Okileucauge is a genus of East Asian long-jawed orb-weavers that was first described by A. Tanikawa in 2001.<ref name=Tani2001>{{cite journal| last=Tanikawa| first=A.| year=2001| title=Okileucauge sasakii, a new genus and species of spider from Okinawajima Island, southwest Japan (Araneae, Tetragnathidae)| journal=Journal of Arachnology| pages=16–20| volume=29| doi=10.1636/0161-8202(2001)029[0016:OSANGA]2.0.CO;2| s2cid=85189408| url=https://www.biodiversitylibrary.org/part/227072}}</ref>

Species
 it contains nine species, found in Japan and China:Okileucauge elongatus Zhao, Peng & Huang, 2012 – ChinaOkileucauge geminuscavum Chen & Zhu, 2009 – ChinaOkileucauge gongshan Zhao, Peng & Huang, 2012 – ChinaOkileucauge hainan Zhu, Song & Zhang, 2003 – ChinaOkileucauge nigricauda Zhu, Song & Zhang, 2003 – ChinaOkileucauge sasakii Tanikawa, 2001 – JapanOkileucauge tanikawai Zhu, Song & Zhang, 2003 – ChinaOkileucauge tibet Zhu, Song & Zhang, 2003 – ChinaOkileucauge yinae'' Zhu, Song & Zhang, 2003 – China

See also
 List of Tetragnathidae species

References

Araneomorphae genera
Spiders of Asia
Tetragnathidae